In mathematical analysis, a null set  is a measurable set that has measure zero.  This can be characterized as a set that can be covered by a countable union of intervals of arbitrarily small total length. 

The notion of null set should not be confused with the empty set as defined in set theory. Although the empty set has Lebesgue measure zero, there are also non-empty sets which are null.  For example, any non-empty countable set of real numbers has Lebesgue measure zero and therefore is null.

More generally, on a given measure space  a null set is a set  such that .

Example 

Every finite or countably infinite subset of the real numbers is a null set. For example, the set of natural numbers and the set of rational numbers are both countably infinite and therefore are null sets when considered as subsets of the real numbers.

The Cantor set is an example of an uncountable null set.

Definition 
Suppose  is a subset of the real line  such that 

Properties 
The empty set is always a null set. More generally, any countable union of null sets is null. Any subset of a null set is itself a null set. Together, these facts show that the m-null sets of X form a sigma-ideal on X. Similarly, the measurable m-null sets form a sigma-ideal of the sigma-algebra of measurable sets. Thus, null sets may be interpreted as negligible sets, defining a notion of almost everywhere.

Lebesgue measure 
The Lebesgue measure is the standard way of assigning a length, area or volume to subsets of Euclidean space.

A subset N of  has null Lebesgue measure and is considered to be a null set in  if and only if:
In fact, the idea can be made to make sense on any manifold, even if there is no Lebesgue measure there.

For instance:
 Sard's lemma: the set of critical values of a smooth function has measure zero.

In terms of null sets, the following equivalence has been styled a Fubini's theorem: 
 For  and

Uses 
This motivates the formal definition of  spaces as sets of equivalence classes of functions which differ only on null sets.

A measure in which all subsets of null sets are measurable is complete. Any non-complete measure can be completed to form a complete measure by asserting that subsets of null sets have measure zero. Lebesgue measure is an example of a complete measure; in some constructions, it is defined as the completion of a non-complete Borel measure.

A subset of the Cantor set which is not Borel measurable 
The Borel measure is not complete. (Since the Lebesgue measure is complete, this  is of course Lebesgue measurable.)

First, we have to know that every set of positive measure contains a nonmeasurable subset. Hence  has measure zero, so  has measure one. We need a strictly monotonic function, so consider . Since  is strictly monotonic and continuous, it is a homeomorphism. Furthermore,  has measure one. Let  be non-measurable, and let . Because  is injective, we have that , and so  is a null set. However, if it were Borel measurable, then  would also be Borel measurable (here we use the fact that the preimage of a Borel set by a continuous function is measurable;  is the preimage of F through the continuous function .) Therefore,  is a null, but non-Borel measurable set.

Haar null
In a separable Banach space , the group operation moves any subset  to the translates  for any .

The term refers to the null invariance of the measures of translates, associating it with the complete invariance found with Haar measure.

Some algebraic properties of topological groups have been related to the size of subsets and Haar null sets.
Haar null sets have been used in Polish groups to show that when  is not a meagre set then  contains an open neighborhood of the identity element. This property is named for Hugo Steinhaus since it is the conclusion of the Steinhaus theorem.

See also 
 Cantor function
 Measure (mathematics)
 Empty set
 Nothing

References

Further reading

 
 
 

Measure theory
Set theory